Cover art is a type of artwork presented as an illustration or photograph on the outside of a published product such as a book (often on a dust jacket), magazine, newspaper (tabloid), comic book, video game (box art), music album (album art), CD, videotape, DVD, or podcast.

The art has a primarily commercial function, for instance to promote the product it is displayed on, but can also have an aesthetic function, and may be artistically connected to the product, such as with art by the creator of the product.

Album cover art
Album cover art is artwork created for a music album. Notable album cover art includes Pink Floyd's The Dark Side of the Moon, King Crimson's In the Court of the Crimson King, the Beatles' Sgt. Pepper's Lonely Hearts Club Band, Abbey Road and their self-titled "White Album" among others. Albums can have cover art created by the musician, as with Joni Mitchell's Clouds, or by an associated musician, such as Bob Dylan's artwork for the cover of Music from Big Pink, by the Band, Dylan's backup band's first album.

Artists known for their album cover art include Alex Steinweiss, an early pioneer in album cover art, Roger Dean, and the Hipgnosis studio. Some album art may cause controversy because of nudity, offending churches, trademark or others. There have been numerous books documenting album cover art, particularly rock and jazz album covers. Steinweiss was an art director and graphic designer who brought custom artwork to record album covers and invented the first packaging for long-playing records.

Book cover
A book cover is usually made up of images (illustrations, photographs, or a combination of both) and text. It usually includes the book title and author and can also include (but not always) a book tagline or quote. The book cover design is usually designed by a graphic designer or book designer, working in-house at a publisher or freelance. Once the front cover art has been approved, they will then continue to design the layout of the spine (including the book title, author name and publisher imprint logo) and the back cover (usually including a book blurb and sometimes the barcode and publisher logo). Books can be designed as a set of series or as an individual design. Very commonly, the same book will be designed with a different cover in different countries to suit the specific audience. For example, a cover designed for Australia may have a completely different design in the United Kingdom and again in the United States.

Book cover art has had books written on the subject. Numerous artists have become noted for their book cover art, including Richard M. Powers and Chip Kidd. In one of the most recognizable book covers in American literature, two sad female eyes (and bright red lips) adrift in the deep blue of a night sky, hover ominously above a skyline that glows like a carnival.  Evocative of sorrow and excess, the haunting image has become so inextricably linked to The Great Gatsby that it still adorns the cover of F. Scott Fitzgerald's book 88 years after its debut.  The iconic cover art was created by Spanish artist Francis Cugat. With the release of a big Hollywood movie, however, some printings of the book have abandoned the classic cover in favor of one that ties in more closely with the film.

Magazine cover
Magazine cover artists include Art Spiegelman, who modernized the look of The New Yorker magazine, and his predecessor Rea Irvin, who created the Eustace Tilly character for the magazine. Magazine cover artists who were well-known for capturing important political and social issues of the day include Norman Rockwell, whose work appeared 322 times on the cover of The Saturday Evening Post, and Dennis Wheeler, whose 40 covers for Time magazine illustrated social movements and news events of the 1960s and 1970s; seven of them are in the permanent collection of the Museum of Modern Art in New York City.

Tabloid cover
Today, the word tabloid is used as a derogatory descriptor of a style of journalism, rather than its original intent as an indicator of half-broadsheet size. This tends to cloud the fact that the great tabloids were skilfully produced amalgams of human interest stories told with punchy brevity, a clarity drawn from the choice of simple but effective words and often with a dose of wit. The gossipy tabloid scandal sheets, as we know them today, have been around since 1830.  That's when Benjamin Day and James Gordon Bennett Sr., the respective publishers of The Sun and the New York Herald, launched what became known as the penny press (whose papers sold for one cent apiece).  But some of what is considered the world's best journalism has been tabloid. From the days when John Pilger revealed the truth of Cambodia's Killing Fields in the Daily Mirror, to the stream of revelations that showed the hypocrisy of John Major's "back to basics" cabinet, award-winning writing in the tabloids is acknowledged every year at the National Press Awards.

Good cover art can lead readers to this fact; the New York Herald, for example, offers some examples of tabloid cover art. So too does the News & Review, a free weekly published in Nevada and California. The tabloid has thrived since the 1970s, and uses cartoonish cover art. Tabloids have a modern role to play, and along with good cover art (and new ideas) they fill a niche.

Popular music scores (early 20th century) 

Sheet music cover artists include Frederick S. Manning, William Austin Starmer and Frederick Waite Starmer, all three of whom worked for Jerome H. Remick.  Other prolific artists included Albert Wilfred Barbelle, André C. De Takacs, and Gene Buck.  E. H. Pfeiffer did cover illustrations for Gotham-Attucks; Remick, F.B. Haviland Pub. Co.; Jerome & Schwartz Publishing Company; Lew Berk Music Company; Waterson, Berlin & Snyder, Inc.; and others.

Gallery

Books

Newspapers, magazines, comic books

Sheet music, recorded music

See also

Book cover
History of graphic design
List of controversial album art
Video game packaging

References

Illustration
Graphic design
Comics terminology
Works by cover artist
Covers by artist